Jasser Yahya (Arabic:جاسر يحيى) (born 19 December 1992) is a Qatari footballer. He currently plays for Al-Khor as a midfielder.

External links

References

Qatari footballers
1992 births
Living people
Qatar Stars League players
Al Sadd SC players
Al-Arabi SC (Qatar) players
Umm Salal SC players
Al-Khor SC players
Association football midfielders